KBBW (1010 kHz) is a commercial AM radio station in Waco, Texas.  It is owned by American Broadcasting of Texas and airs a Christian talk and teaching radio format.  KBBW is powered at 10,000 watts by day.  But because 1010 AM is a Canadian clear channel frequency, KBBW must reduce power at night to 2,500 watts to avoid interference.

In addition to its AM signal, KBBW is relayed by three FM translators, K290CV 105.9 MHz Waco, K267CA 101.3 MHz Temple/Killeen, and K262DG 100.3 MHz in Georgetown/Round Rock.

Programming
KBBW is a brokered time station.  National and local religious leaders buy blocks of time on the station and may use their shows to appeal for donations to their ministries.  National hosts include David Jeremiah, Jim Daly, Chuck Swindoll, Joyce Meyer, Charles Stanley, J. Vernon McGee, Greg Laurie, Adrian Rogers, Steve Arterburn, Jim Dobson and Billy Graham.  Some programming is supplied by the Salem Radio Network, including a conservative political talk show hosted by attorney Jay Sekulow.

History
In April 1953, the station signed on the air as KMLW in Marlin, Texas.  Its call sign indicated that it served both MarLin and Waco, the larger city nearby.  It was only powered at 250 watts and was a daytimer, required to sign-off at night to avoid interfering with other, more powerful stations on 1010 AM.  It was owned by KMLW, Inc. and had studios on the Marlin-Waco Highway.

By the 1970s, it had gotten Federal Communications Commission permission to move its city of license to Waco.  It got a boost in power to 10,000 watts, but was still a daytime-only station.  It aired a country music format as KKIK.  It carried news from Associated Press Radio.

The station was acquired by American Broadcasting of Texas in 1986.  American Broadcasting switched the format to Christian talk and teaching, now broadcasting 24 hours a day.

Translators

References

External links

BBW
BBW
Radio stations established in 1962